Tour of Iran (Azerbaijan) 2018 was a UCI Asia Tour 2.1 event and the 33rd edition of Tour of Iran (Azerbaijan) which took place in six stages between September 29-October 4, 2018 in Iranian Azerbaijan. The race started in the city of Tabriz and traveled through Urmia, Jolfa, and Sarein.

Teams
Thirteen teams participated in the race. Each team had a maximum of six riders:

Overview

Stages

Stage 1 
 Tabriz – Urmia (150.1 km)

Stage 2 
 Urmia – Aras Free Zone (209.4 km)

Stage 3 
 Aras Free Zone – Tabriz (147.8 km)

Stage 4 
 Tabriz – Sarein (196.2 km)

Stage 5 
 Sarein – Tabriz (198.9 km)

Stage 6 
 Tabriz – Tabriz (91.2 km)

Final standings

References

2018
2018 UCI Asia Tour
2018 in Iranian sport